Xiangyanglou Subdistrict is a subdistrict located on the northern portion of Hedong District, Tianjin. it borders Changzhou Street Subdistrict in the north, Dongxin Subdistrict in the east, Shanghang Road Subdistrict in the south, and Tangjiakou Subdistrict in the west. In 2010, the subdistrict was home to 80,678 residents.

The subdistrict was established in 1979 from a portion of Tangjiakou Subdistrict. Its name Xiangyanglou can be roughly translated to "Building that faces the sun".

Administrative divisions 
The table below lists all the 16 communities under Xiangyanglou Subdistrict in the year 2021:

References 

Township-level divisions of Tianjin
Hedong District, Tianjin